Yacuambi Canton is a canton of Ecuador, located in the Zamora-Chinchipe Province.  Its capital is the town of Yacuambi.  Its population at the 2001 census was 5,229.

References

Cantons of Zamora-Chinchipe Province